Acharia extensa is a species in the family Limacodidae. It is found in Mexico and the United States, where it has been recorded from the southern tip of Florida.

The larvae have been recorded feeding on Inga species, Quercus species, Byrsonima crassifolia and Coffea arabica.

References 

Limacodidae
Moths described in 1896